Paraceratites elegans is an extinct species of ammonite cephalopod in the family Ceratitidae. It is known from the Triassic of China and Israel.

References

 Paraceratites elegans at The Paleobiology Database

Ceratitidae
Triassic cephalopods
Fossils of China
Fauna of Israel
Fossil taxa described in 1882
Molluscs described in 1882